The year 1887 in architecture involved some significant architectural events and new buildings.

Events
 Construction work begins on
 Shrine of Our Lady of the Rosary, Rosario, Argentina.
 Provinciaal Hof, Bruges, Flanders, designed by Louis Delacenserie and René Buyck.
 Ponce de León Hotel, St. Augustine, Florida, designed by Carrère and Hastings.

Buildings and structures

Buildings opened

 March 29 – Peebles Old Parish Church, Scotland, designed by William Young (dedicated).
 April 23 – Metropolitan Cathedral, Iași, Romania, completed by Alexandru Orăscu (dedicated).
 June 20 – Victoria Terminus of the Great Indian Peninsula Railway in Bombay, designed by Frederick William Stevens.
 December 1 – Raffles Hotel, Singapore.

Buildings completed
 Cardiff Metropolitan Cathedral, designed by Pugin & Pugin.
 New façade of Florence Cathedral, designed by Emilio De Fabris (died 1883).
 Basilica of St. Nicholas, Amsterdam, designed by Adrianus Bleijs.
 St Paul's Church, Aarhus, designed by Vilhelm Theodor Walther.
 Cluj-Napoca Neolog Synagogue, Romania, designed by engineer Izidor Hegner.
 Eldridge Street Synagogue, New York City, designed by Peter and Francis William Herter.
 Sacred Heart Cathedral, Sarajevo, designed by Josip Vancaš.
 Rebuilt Gare Saint-Lazare terminus of Chemins de fer de l'Ouest in Paris, designed by Juste Lisch.
 Clock tower of Rochdale Town Hall in England, designed by Alfred Waterhouse.

Awards
 RIBA Royal Gold Medal – Ewan Christian.

Publications
 MacGibbon and Ross begin publication of The Castellated and Domestic Architecture of Scotland, from the twelfth to the eighteenth century.
 G. A. Wayss publishes Das System Monier-Eisengerippe mit Cementumhüllung-in seiner Anwendung auf das gesammte Bauwesen in Berlin, one of the first books on reinforced concrete (using Joseph Monier's system).

Births
 March 21 – Erich Mendelsohn, German-Jewish Expressionist architect (died 1953)
 May 10 – Herbert James Rowse, English architect noted for work in Liverpool (died 1963)
 May 31 – Philip Tilden, English domestic architect (died 1956)
 June 15 – Oliver Hill, English architect (died 1968)
 August 30 – Eric Francis, British architect and painter (died 1976)
 October 6 – Le Corbusier (Charles-Édouard Jeanneret), Swiss-French architect, designer, painter, urban planner, writer and pioneer of modern architecture (died 1965)

Deaths
 April 13 – David Stirling, Scottish-born Canadian architect (born 1822)
 May 8 – Thomas Stevenson, Scottish lighthouse engineer (born 1818)
 May 21 – Sir Horace Jones, English architect (born 1819)
 August 16 – Webster Paulson, English civil engineer (born 1837)

References

Buildings and structures completed in 1887
Years in architecture
19th-century architecture